The Dena Foundation for Contemporary Art (DFCA) is an American non-profit organization that promotes contemporary visual arts and young artists in that field.

DFCA was founded in New York in 2001 by art collector Giuliana Setari Carusi.  It has another office in Paris.

Mission 
DFCA is dedicated to strengthening the ties and the interactions between Italian culture and that of other countries, with a particular interest in the United States and France. DFCA helps artists living in Italy who participate in the Artists Residency Programs in New York and in Paris.

DFCA creates collaborations between artists, museum directors, directors of research programs and professionals of the art world. It organizes and supports roundtables, conferences, seminars and exhibitions.

DFCA created Dena Foundation Art Award for young artists who have created a work with social relevance for a public space. DFCA supports the publication of artist’s books and art magazines and provides production grants for artist participation in International artistic events.

Artists and curators Residency Programs 
DFCA promotes artists in residence programs and provides scholarships for these programs.

DFCA Scholarship at the Omi International Arts Center
The Art Omi International Artists Residency is a three-week residency program in July for visual artists  at the Omi International Arts Center in Ghent, New York. The DFCA program is handled each year by a different critic-in-residence and gathers a group of artists from different countries and nationalities.

In 2001, For this program, DFCA establish a scholarship to an artist from Central Italy or Southern Italy.

Because Omi is close to New York City, DFCA participants benefit from visiting art critics, gallery owners and artists.  In the evenings the group gathers for lectures, slide presentations and panel discussions. At the end of the residency, the DFCA artists share their projects with an audience of art professionals.

Previous DFCA residents include: Nicoletta Agostini (2003), Stanislao di Giugno (2005), Matteo Fato (2010), Francesco Jodice (2002), Domenico Mangano (2004), Luana Perilli (2008), Corrado Sassi (2006), Marinella Senatore (2009), Donatella Spaziani (2001)

Since 2011, DFCA has partnered with the MARCA Museum in Catanzaro and the Province of Catanzaro to reward an artist from Calabria. Domenico Cordì was the recipient of the 2011 scholarship.

The DFCA Scholarship at the Centre International d'Accueil et d'Echanges des Récollets
Since 2003, the DFCA promotes an Artists and curators Residency Program at the Centre International d’Accueil et d’Echanges des Récollets in Paris.  The DFCA residency takes place in the fall.  
The DCPA program gathers a group of artists selected by scientific committees, by invitation only, and is managed by a director.

The DFCA program introduces artists to the French and international art scene. The artists receive advice and feedback from art critics and curators, directors of international institutions, gallery owners, collectors and artists. The artists participate in DCPA activities and round tables or exhibitions.

The DFCA Paris program is supported by public and private partners, principally the city of Milan.

The artists involved in the DFCA Paris program include:
Rebecca Agnes (2003), Nicoletta Agostini (2004), Meris Angioletti (2005), Paola Anziché (2008), Lucia Barbagallo (2010), Michele Bazzana (2009), Valerio Berruti (2007) Dafne Boggeri (2004), Alessandro Bulgini (2004), Assila Cherfi (2010), Dafni & Papadatos (2003), Martina della Valle (2007), Cleo Fariselli (2009), Matteo Fato (2011), Michael Fliri (2008), Francesco Fossati, Linda Fregni Nagler (2008), Giovanni Giaretta (2010), Antonella Grieco (2008), Invernomuto (2007), Diego Marcon (2009), Federico Peri (2007), Alessandro Piangiamore (2007), Luca Pozzi (2009), Richard Sympson (2009), Angelo Sarleti (2006), Ester Sparatore (2004), Donatella Spaziani (2003), Alberto Tadiello (2008), Alice Tomaselli (2010), Coniglio Viola (2008)

DFCA has established a three-year agreement for the Premio d’Artista of the Fondazione Sparkasse in Bolzano, Italy initiated by Fondazione Museion. The artists selected were Michael Fliri (2008) and Ignaz Cassar (2010)

In 2011, the NAC-National Arts Council of Singapore ask DFCA to establish a partnership aimed at promoting emerging Singaporean artists  through a residency in Paris: Hafiz B Osman and Debbie Ding are the 2012 grant recipients.

Partners
DFCA has developed partnerships in order to promote its activities. Among them Accademia delle Belle Arti di Brera, Youth Department of the Municipality of Milan, Centre culturel français of Milan, Prime Minister Department of Youth, Ministry for Heritage and Cultural Activities PARC - General Directorate for Quality and Protection, GAI, Accademia Albertina delle Belle Arti in Turin, Museion, Municipality of Turin, Fondazione Spinola Banna per l’Arte, Unicredit Private Banking, Fondazione Sparkasse, Fondazione Cariplo, Free Undo, RAM / Zerynthia Accademia Albertina, Museion and Sparkasse Foundation.

The DFCA Art Award
In 2001 DFCA established the Dena Foundation Art Award, awarded to young artists who have created a socially-relevant project in a public space. The prize is accompanied by the publication of a book conceived by the artist.

DCPA Art Award recipients have been: Ryan Gander (2007), Great Britain, presented by Hans Ulrich Obrist, Renata Lucas (2009), Brazil, presented by Carolyn Christov-Bakargiev, Michael Rakowitz (2003), United States, presented by Carolyn Christov-Bakargiev, Michael Sailstorfer (2005), Germany, presented by Helmut Fridel, Fabien Verschaere (2001), France, presented by Hans Ulrich Obrist, Luca Vitone (2002), Italy, presented by Roberto Pinto.

Exhibitions and events
DFCA promotes contemporary art through round tables, conferences and exhibitions, in different cities in collaboration with European institutions in the context of cultural events.
Among the others, the exhibitions Beyond the Dust – Artists’ Documents Today (2010–2011), Inhabituel (2005), the round table Ubiquity as a paradigm of contemporary culture and life (2004), the conference Jeune photographie italienne contemporaine: une géographie des talents naissants (2008), the Journées Portes Ouvertes at the Centre International d’Accueil et d’Echanges des Récollets (2009–2011)

Special projects
Top 100 by Davide Bertocchi since 2003.

See also
Giuliana Setari Carusi

References
Publications
 Beyond the Dust – Artists’ Documents Today, Ed. Roma Publications, commissioned by CNAP (Centre national des arts plastiques), Paris, 2011.
 Lucas Renata, Postpone the End, with an interview with the artist by Carolyn Christov-Bakargiev, Ed. SilvanaEditoriale, Milan / Dena Foundation for Contemporary Art, Paris, 2010.
 Andata e Ritorno, Aller-Retour, Round Trip, ed. Municipality of Milan – Sport and Leisure Department, Milan / Dena Foundation for Contemporary Art, Paris, 2007.
 Gander Ryan, Intellectual Colours, with an interview with the artist by Hans Ulrich Obrist, Ed. SilvanaEditoriale, Milan / Dena Foundation for Contemporary Art, Paris, 2007.
 Sailstorfer Michael, Michael Sailstorfer, with an interview with the artist by Helmut Friedel, Ed. Silvana Editoriale, Milan / Dena Foundation for Contemporary Art, Paris, 2006.
 La Fabbrica del Vapore, collaboration with Dena Foundation for Contemporary Art, ed. Associazione Culturale FdV, Milan, 2006.
 Agnello Chiara, Debray Régis, Maffesoli Michel, Obrist Hans Ulrich, Parisi Chiara, Pinto Roberto, Setari Nicola, Inhabituel, catalogue of exhibition, Ed. onestar press / Dena Foundation for Contemporary Art, Paris, 2005.
 Verschaere Fabien, A Novel for Life, Texts by Chiara Parisi, with an interview with Fabien Verschaere by Jérôme Sans, Ed. Dena Foundation/Palais de Tokyo, site de creation contemporaine/Segno and Progetto, Turin, 2003.
 Rakowitz Michael,Circumventions Michael Rakowitz, with an interview with the artist by Carolyn Christov-Bakargiev, ed. onestar press / Dena Foundation for Contemporary Art, Paris, 2003.
 Vitone Luca, Sound Paths, with an interview with the artist by Roberto Pinto, onestar press/Dena Foundation for Contemporary Art, Paris, 2002.
 Verschaere Fabien, Fabien Verschaere, with an interview with the artist by Hans Ulrich Obrist, Ed. Arte Grafiche Roccia, Turin / Dena Foundation for Contemporary Art, Paris, 2002.

Books
 196 résidences en France, Ed. Centre national des arts plastiques, Paris, 2010
 Granet Danièle, Lamour Catherine, Grands et petits secrets du monde de l’art, Ed. Fayard, 2010
 Benhamou-Huet Judith, Global Collectors, Collectionneurs du monde, Ed. Cinq Sens Phébus, 2008
 Candet Nadia, Collections particulières, 150 commandes privées d'art contemporain en France, Ed. Flammarion, 2008.
 Sacco Pier Luigi, Santagata Walter, Trimarchi Michele, L’arte contemporanea italiana nel mondo, Ed. Skira Opera DARC, Ginevra-Milan, 2005.

Articles
 Anna Saba Didonato, "Calabria contemporanea", Artribune, n°6, March–April, 2012
 Valentina Pugliese, "Dena Foundation for Contemporary Art, tra New York e PArgi, facendo l'occjiolino all'Italia", Summer, 2011
 Gemma Pranzitelli, "Una borsa di studio per volare a New York: premiati gli artisti del centro-sud!", exibart onpaper, July–August, 2011
 Armone Giusy, “Giovani artisti alla conquista del mondo. Un ticket per New York a Domenico Cordì”, Gazzetta del Sud, May 25, 2011
 Iozzo Domenico, “Cordì, un calabrese international”, Calabria Ora, May 25, 2011
 ArteSera, February 2011 (Interview Paola Anziché)
 Régnier Philippe, “L’actualité vue par Giuliana Setari Carusi”, interview, Le Journal de l’Art n°339, January 21 – February 3, 2011
 Paglieri Marina, “Setari: Rivoli va difeso non possiamo buttare un patrimonio comune”, interview, La Repubblica, October 6, 2010.
 Pirelli Marinela, Mojana Marina, “I 40 italiani testimoni di cultura nel mercato dell’arte internazionale”, Plus24, Il Sole 24ore, November 2, 2007.
 zoumzoum.blogs.liberation.fr, November 10, 2008 (Michael Fliri)
 Amadasi Giovanna, “Dolce gusto dell’arte slow”, Il Sole 24 Ore, November 2, 2008 (Alberto Tadiello)
 Massimiliano Tonelli, “Vi presento Dena”, interview, Exibart.on paper n°53, November–December 2008.
 Mojana Marina, “All’estero con Dena e Comune di Milano”, Il Sole 24 Ore, November 29, 2008
 Remotti Margherita, “Borse di studio e premi per i giovani”, Il Sole 24 Ore, November 3, 2008
 Beaux-Arts Magazine, n°275, May 2007 (Dena Foundation Art Award to Ryan Gander)
 Connaissance des Arts, April 2007 (Dena Foundation Art Award to Ryan Gander)
 Lotito Pierre, “Cultura, Milano a scuola dai parigni”, Il Giorno, April 18, 2007
 Sacchi Annachiara, “I talenti di Brera a Parigi. Fabbrica del Vapore come il Beaubourg”, Il Corriere della Sera, April 17, 2007
 Della Frattina Giannino, “Un laboratorio per i talenti in arrivo da tutto il mondo”, Il Giornale, Aprile 17, 2007
 Montella Camilla, “Gavetta parigina per i talenti di Brera Offre il Comune”, Libero, April 17, 2007
 Le Figaro, April 16, 2007 (Dena Foundation Art Award to Ryan Gander)
 Fiz Alberto, Milano Finanza – Gentleman,
 Judith Benhamou-Huet, “Une italienne dans le monde de l’art contemporain”, Les Echos, week-end October 13–14, 2006.
 Casa D n°25, December 2006 (Dena Foundation Art Award to Michael Sailstorfer)
 L’Espresso, January 26, 2006 (Dena Foundation Art Award to Michael Sailstorfer)
 Domus n°890, March 2006 (Dena Foundation Art Award to Michael Sailstorfer)
 Tema Celeste n°114, March–April 2006 (Dena Foundation Art Award to Michael Sailstorfer)
 ArtPress n°309, February 2005 (Exhibition Inhabituel)
 Scardi Gabi, “Artisti per la sopravvivenza”, Sole 24 Ore, April 4, 2004 (Dena Foundation Art Award to Michael Rakowitz)
 L’Espresso n°51, December 2003 (Dena Foundation Art Award to Michael Rakowitz)

Notes

External links
 Official website
 Janus Magazine
 Centre International d'accueil et d'echanges des rècollets
 Omi International Art Center
 Silvana editoriale publications
 Vi presento Dena article on exibart online
 Maria Adelaide Marchesoni and Margherita Remotti Dena Foundation for Contemporary Art, il sole24h
 Residenza a Parigi, Arthub
 Annachiara Sacchi I talenti di Brera a Parigi. «Fabbrica del Vapore come il Beaubourg
 Sconfinare interview to Jacopo Miliani and Francesca di Nardo

Arts foundations based in the United States
Contemporary art galleries in the United States
Art galleries established in 2001
2001 establishments in the United States